Nikolay Nikolaevich Trofimov (January 21, 1920, Sevastopol —  November 7, 2005, St. Petersburg) was a Soviet and Russian theater and film actor. People's Artist of the USSR (1990).

Biography 
Nikolay Trofimov was born into a working-class family. Stage career began in 1934.

During the Great Patriotic War he served in the navy.

On the stage Tovstonogov Bolshoi Drama Theater played more than 40 roles. In the cinema, Nikolai Trofimov played mostly small roles.

Nikolay Nikolaevich Trofimov died on the night of November 7, 2005 in the St. Petersburg Alexandrovsky hospital from the consequences of a stroke. He was buried on November 14 at the Literary Sheds of Volkovskoye Cemetery.

Selected filmography
 Pirogov (1947) as pieman
 Belinsky (Белинский, 1951) as typographic worker
 Tamer of Tigers (Укротительница тигров, 1954) as Myshkin
 Striped Trip (Полосатый рейс, 1961) as navigator
 Cain XVIII (Каин XVIII, 1963) as Agent 214
 Torrents of Steel (Железный поток, 1967) as soldier Chirik
 War and Peace (Война и мир, 1967) as captain Tushin
 Chronicles of a Dive Bomber (Хроника пикирующего бомбардировщика, 1967) as major, commandant of the airfield
 The Diamond Arm (Бриллиантовая рука, 1968) as Colonel of militsiya
 On the Way to Berlin (На пути в Берлин) as Ivan Zaytsev
 Tchaikovsky (Чайковский, 1970) as chief of police 
 Afrikanych (Африканыч, 1970) as Ivan Afrikanych
 About the Little Red Riding Hood (Про Красную Шапочку, 1977) as Small Fat Wolf
 The Circus Princess (Принцесса цирка, 1982) as Duke
 In the Old Rhythms (В старых ритмах, 1982) as Shtykov

Awards
Honored Artist of the RSFSR (1960)
People's Artist of the RSFSR (1974)
People's Artist of the USSR (December 12, 1990) - for great services in the development of Soviet theater art
 Order "For Merit to the Fatherland" 4th class (2000) - for the great contribution to the development of the domestic theatrical art
 Order of the Patriotic War 2nd class (1985)
 Order of the Red Star
 Medal "For the Victory over Germany in the Great Patriotic War 1941–1945"

References

External links
 

1920 births
2005 deaths
Soviet male film actors
Soviet male stage actors
Russian male film actors
Russian male stage actors
Honored Artists of the RSFSR
Russian people of World War II
People's Artists of the USSR
People's Artists of the RSFSR